This article is a list of diseases of bellflowers (Campanula carpatica).

Bacterial diseases

Fungal diseases

Viral and viroid diseases

References

Common Names of Diseases, The American Phytopathological Society

Campanula
Bellflower